Khonkholoy (Khonkholo) is a rural locality (a selo) and the administrative centre of Khonkholoyskoye Rural Settlement, Bichursky District, Republic of Buryatia, Russia. The population was 377 as of 2017.

Geography 
Khonkholoy is located 115 km northeast of Bichura (the district's administrative centre) by road. Nikolsk is the nearest rural locality.

References 

Rural localities in Bichursky District